Geld may refer to:

 Gelding, equine castration
 Danegeld, a tax paid to Viking raiders
 Geld (surname)

See also
 Gel (disambiguation)
 Gelt (disambiguation)